The Droplift Project is a compilation CD of 29 (or 30) tracks created by sound collage artists in July 2000.  It was manufactured by the participants and then "droplifted" into chain music stores.  This process involved having operatives sneak the CD into stores and file it in regular music racks as if it were regular product.  In this way a kind of "reverse shoplifting" results in the artist's work appearing next to "legitimate" products of the dominant culture.  This same process is also known as "Shopdropping" in the U.K.

Project origins
The Droplift Project began  in 1998 when members of a mailing list called "Snuggles," which was organized to discuss the audio collage art of Negativland, began to trade their own collage works online.  Two cassette tape compilations, "The Art/Act of Snuggling" and  "Red Hand Dave" preceded the project, but these were limited edition tape trading projects not intended for wider distribution.  Discussion online began to steer the group towards creating a CD of tracks, but the concept only came together when Richard Holland recommended the "Droplift" idea, which he had practiced earlier with his group "The Institute of Sonic Ponderance."

Project operation
Under the stewardship of animator and sometimes Negativland collaborator Tim Maloney, the tracks were submitted via FTP, collated, mastered, and pressed to CD.  Copies were sent all over America as well as some other countries for droplifting.  On July 28, 2000, a coordinated effort was made amongst participants to  drop the discs in chain record stores as a kind of protest against the music industry and especially the distribution of music at that time.  Only 1000 discs were manufactured, but the audio materials, CD packaging, and other materials are still available online.

Track listing

References

External links
 Droplift web site as of Jun 1, 2013, prior to disappearance

2000 compilation albums